FK Mikulovice is a Czech football club located in the village of Mikulovice in the Olomouc Region. Mikulovice played in the Moravian–Silesian Football League, which is the third highest league in the Czech republic.

In 2011 FK Mikulovice played against team from Synot Liga – FK Teplice in Czech Cup, but they lost 0–4.

Two years later they had their second chance. They played against SK Sigma Olomouc, but they lost again 1–2. Kamil Šebesta scored the only Mikulovice's goal.

At the season 2013/2014 Mikulovice were in Moravian–Silesian Football League. Mikulovice ended the season on the 13th place, but they voluntarily relegated to Okresní Přebor because MSFL was very financially demanding for such a small club as FK Mikulovice was.

Season 2014/15 was the beginning of the new age of this football club. They were in Okresní Přebor and they ended the season on the 10th position. Next season 2015/16 it wasn't better, because of the 11th position. But the 2016/17 season was breakthrough. At the half of the season, the team was on the 6th place with just 4 points loss for the league leader. And at the end of the season they were on the 4th position. First three teams didn't want to promote to higher league, so Mikulovice will play I.B třída in the 2017/18 season.

Players

First team squad

Former famous players

Player of the Season

Young Player of the Season

References

Football clubs in the Czech Republic
Sport in the Olomouc Region
Jeseník District